Robert Opie Norris Jr. (November 4, 1880 – June 21, 1960) was an American Democratic politician who served as a member of the Virginia House of Delegates and Senate. He was the Senate's President pro tempore from 1945 to 1950.

The Robert O. Norris Bridge that spans the Rappahannock River between Lancaster and Middlesex counties is named in his honor.

References

External links
 
 

1880 births
1960 deaths
Democratic Party members of the Virginia House of Delegates
University of Richmond alumni
Democratic Party Virginia state senators
20th-century American politicians
People from Lancaster County, Virginia